Auratonota rubromixta is a species of moth of the family Tortricidae. It is found in Ecuador.

The wingspan is about 19 mm. The ground colour of the forewings is cream, preserved only along pattern elements. These are distinctly suffused with pale ferruginous between them. The markings are rust with reddish and brown admixtures. The hindwings are white cream, tinged with brownish in the apical third.

Etymology
The specific name refers to the colouration of some pattern elements and is derived from Latin: ruber (meaning red) and mixta (meaning mixed).

References

Moths described in 2008
Auratonota
Moths of South America